Beseytin (also Romanized as Beseytīn, Beseyteyn, and Baseytīn; also known as Basetīn) is a village in Howmeh-ye Gharbi Rural District, in the Central District of Ramhormoz County, Khuzestan Province, Iran. At the 2006 census, its population was 58, in 9 families.

References 

Populated places in Ramhormoz County